Topswops (and the variants Topdrops, Bottomswops and Bottomdrops) are mathematical problems devised and analysed by the British mathematician John Conway in 1973. Contrary to other games and problems introduced by Conway, these problems have not received much attention from the scientific community. Two famous mathematicians who have contributed to the problem are Martin Gardner and Donald Knuth.

Formulation
In each variant of the problem, Conway uses a deck of playing cards. Since the numerical values of the deck are only relevant, only one suit is used.

Topswops
For topswops the following algorithm is applied:
 Consider the first card from the pile (which is )
 Take the first  cards from the pile
 Swap these cards and place them back on the pile
 Repeat step 1, 2 and 3 until the top card is 

The topswops problem is occasionally named differently, with naming including deterministic pancake problem, topswops, topswaps, reverse card shuffle and fannkuch.

The problem formulated by Conway is the following:
Which initial configuration leads to the maximum number of 'swops' before the algorithm terminates?

In literature there are some attempts to find lower and upper bounds for the number of iterations .

As an example, we consider . We are specifically interested in numbers which are at 'the correct position'. These are: 2, 5, 9, 10, 12.

Claim: after each iteration of the algorithm, the Wilf number increases.

Proof: We perform one iteration of the algorithm. The remaining numbers at 'the correct position' will in general not be at 'the correct position' anymore. Nevertheless, the 's number is at the correct position.

The maximal Wilf number is found when each number is at the correct position. By refining the proof, the given upper bound can be proven to be a real upper bound for the number of iterations. 

Theorem:  is bounded by the th Fibonacci number.

Proof by Murray S. Klamkin: Suppose that during the algorithm, the first number  takes on in total  distinct values.

Claim: .

Proof: We prove the claim by mathematical induction. For , the algorithm directly terminates, hence, . Thus  and since  the claim is proven.

All  values that  takes on, are ordered and can be written as: . Denote . The remaining iterations will always retain . Hence  can now take on at most  values.

During the algorithm, we are sure that both  and  have never been at position , unless .

Suppose . Then  since  takes on at most  distinct values. So it follows that .

Suppose . Then  since  takes on at most  distinct values. Using the claim, it follows that  . This proves the theorem. 

The optimal values are, however, still unknown. There have been several attempts to find the optimal values, for example by  A. Pepperdine. For rows with 17 or fewer numbers, the exact solution is known. Larger rows only have lower bounds, which is shown on the right.

It is yet unknown whether this problem is NP-hard.

Topdrops
A similar problem is topdrops, where the same playing cards are used. In this problem, the first card of the pile is shown (and has value ). Take the first  cards of the pile, change the order and place them back on the bottom of the pile (which contrasts topswops, where the cards are placed at the top). This problem allows for infinite loops. As an example, we consider the row 2,1,3,4. By applying the algorithm, the following sequence is obtained:
 2 1 3 4
 3 4 1 2
 2 1 4 3
 4 3 1 2
 2 1 3 4
whereafter the original row is found again.

Botswops
In this variant, the bottom card of the pile is taken (and again named ). Then the first  cards of the pile are swapped. Unless the bottom card is the highest card in the pile, nothing happens. This makes the problem uninteresting due to the limited behaviour.

Botdrops
The final variant is botdrops where the bottom card of the pile is taken (again ). In this variant, the bottom  cards are swapped.

References

External links
OEIS: page 375 (topswops)
OEIS: page 376 (topswops which ends up sorted)
Rosetta code: Computing Topswops in multiple programming languages
Topswops competition to compute the maximal number of iterations

John Horton Conway
Recreational mathematics